is a district of Chiyoda, Tokyo, Japan. As of April 1, 2007, the district's population is 483.

Hayabusachō is located of the western part of Chiyoda. It borders Kōjimachi to the north, the Tokyo Imperial Palace to the east, Nagatachō to the south, and Hirakawachō to the west.

This district is known as the location of the National Theatre of Japan and the Supreme Court of Japan.

Places
Supreme Court of Japan
National Theatre of Japan
National Engei Hall
Hayabusachō Branch Government Office
Hayabusachō Jūtaku
Grand Arc Hanzomon
Miyakezaka

Education
 operates public elementary and junior high schools. Kōjimachi Elementary School (麹町小学校) is the zoned elementary of Hayabusachō. There is a freedom of choice system for junior high schools in Chiyoda Ward, and so there are no specific junior high school zones.

References

Districts of Chiyoda, Tokyo